Adam Levinzon, (born in 1977 in Tel-Aviv, Israel), known better by his stage name as "The Big Fishi"  (Fishy HaGadol, Fishi Hagadol - פישי הגדול) and "Adam Ben-Lavi," is a music producer and an Israeli rapper.

Childhood
Adam was born and raised in Tel-Aviv. When he was young he got interested in reggae music. He got his nickname "Fishi" by his friends in the neighborhood, because he was thin and wears glasses, and he looked like the character "Fishenzon" from the Israeli movie Alex Holeh Ahavah.

Career
Levinson was a popular rap singer in the 1990s and early 2000s.  His early career was influenced by the reggae singer Nigel the Admor (Yehoshua Sofer). Adam became famous as a rapper after he participated in the big hit of the band Shabak Samech in the year 1997 that called "blow in the trumpet" in the album in a wrapper of a candy. In 1999 he recorded another hit song with Kobi Oz and the band Teapacks called "Dina", and afterwards he realized his debut album Fishi Hagadol, which came out the same year through the publisher Hed Arzi.

Recent years
In the year 2000 he released his second album Hasandak (The Godfather) also with Hed Arzi. In 2005 he returned to religion and changed his name to Adam Yosef Ben Lavi. In 2006 he recorded with the electro producer Skazi the hit song "Hit & Run".

From 2007, Adam kept on producing music, help the youth to get out from the streets to create music, and got involved with writing and development. Adam is still putting on shows. He married in 2012.

Albums
Fishi Hagadol (1999)
Hasandak (2000)
Hohmat Rehov (2004)
Hahaii'm Bablock (2010)

References

External links

 
 

Israeli rappers
1977 births
Living people
Musicians from Tel Aviv